TEXAF or Societe Financière et de Gestion TEXAF (previously UTEXAFRICA, Congotex UTEXLEO, UTEXCO) was a major textile manufacturer of the Democratic Republic of the Congo. Since the 2007 liquidation of its textile manufacturing division, it has been operated out of Belgium and Kinshasa as part of a larger Belgian-headquartered Congolese textile and industrial firm under the name TEXAF.  Under a series of brands, TEXAF operates in the sectors of textile design/distribution, transport, housing and construction, mechanical, and cotton plantation.  UTEX operates quarrying under the name CARRIGRES, machine and rail transport fabrication under the name MECLCO, consumer textile sales branded as UTEXAFRICA, and a medical hospital, the Hospital Center UTEXAFRICA in Kinshasa.  All its arms operate in the DRC, while the company is based in Brussels.

History
TEXAF is best known as a brand name of DRC produced consumer textiles, along with UTEX, UTEXAFRICA, ONAFITEX, UTEXELEO, UTEXCO and IMMOTEX.  From independence consumer textiles were among the most high profile domestic industries in Congo/Zaire. Based in Kinshasa, the company traces its lineage back to a 1925 Franco-Belgian company, founded in the then Belgian Congo, called TEXAF.

In the 1930s—1950s the original TEXAF concession sold off its cotton plantation and shipping elements and focused on its textile production division, under the name UTEXLEO (founded 1934).  Its name stood for Usines Textiles du Leopoldville, from the colonial name for Kinshasa. In 1960 it was the 31st most capitalized Conogolese company, though it remained European owned. Following independence, President Mobutu's "Zaireization" campaign saw the company nationalized in 1974, and renamed to reflect the new names of the country and its capital: UTEXCO.  In the late 1970s and 1980s, the holding company of these brands—TEXAF—consolidated much of the Zaire textile industry, with the acquisitions of SOLBENA, Zaïreprint (printing), Otricot-Super Star (food), ESTAGRICO (cotton), MECELCO (construction) COTONNIERE DU KASAI-MANIEMA, and the reacquisition of the resources of its cotton farming company (sold off in 1934) ONAFITEX. From 1980, a series of European companies held majority stock in TEXAF. 

The Congolese Civil War saw the deterioration of all Congolese industry, and TEXAF also suffered as its large "UTEXAFRICA Concession" plants and offices in Kinshasa city center were looted and destroyed in 1997. In 2001 TEXAF (now under the name UTEXAFRICA) was bankrupted and was eventually combined with BNP Paribas owned COBEPA. ownership changed again several times until the combined brands were purchased by Chinese firm CHA Textiles in 2004.  From this point, UTEXAFRICA operated its consumer textiles division under the name CONGOTEX.  In 2007, CONGOTEX was liquidated, marking the end of any independent Congolese textile industry.  From this time, TEXAF textiles are produced overseas for Congolese and other markets.

Operations
Congotex' website states that the company is the largest textile and apparel manufacturer in the DRC.  Congotex produces:
Fabrics
Paramedical supplies including gauze, sterile cotton and dressings
Manufactured clothing and goods including uniforms, dresses, suits, towels, et cetera

References

 Congotex official site
 Texaf official website, "History" page

Manufacturing companies based in Brussels
Manufacturing companies of the Democratic Republic of the Congo
Companies based in Kinshasa